Cameraria hikosanensis is a moth of the family Gracillariidae. It is known from Kyushu, Japan.

The wingspan is 7-7.5 mm.

The larvae feed on Viburnum erosum and Viburnum sieboldi. They probably mine the leaves of their host plant.

References

Cameraria (moth)
Moths of Japan
Moths described in 1963
Taxa named by Tosio Kumata